Songs Not to Get Married To is the fourth studio album by American rock band Reggie and the Full Effect. The album still follows the same musical style as previous albums, but the concept of the album is a lot darker than past releases from the band.  Right before and during the writing and recording of the album, James Dewees went through a divorce with his wife, Megan. Most of the songs on the album deal with the anger and sadness of going through a divorce.

The album sold rather well, reaching #25 on the Billboard Heatseekers Chart and #26 on the Billboard'''s Independent Albums chart.

The song "Get Well Soon" is featured on the 2006 video game Saints Row, and an altered version of "Take Me Home, Please" was featured in the 2005 video game The Sims 2''.

Track listing

Personnel

Band
James Dewees - Vocals, Keyboard
Cory White - Guitar
Rob Pope - Bass
Ryan Pope - Drums

Other
Ed Rose - Production, Mixing
Sean Ingram - Vocals

Charts

References

2005 albums
Reggie and the Full Effect albums
Albums produced by Ed Rose